Koehn Lake is a dry lake, and seasonally endorheic lake, in the Fremont Valley of the Mojave Desert, in eastern Kern County, California.

Geography

The nearby ghost town of Saltdale was founded in 1915, for salt harvesting from the dry lakebed.  The ghost town of Garlock is on the north. The southern portal of Burro Schmidt Tunnel overlooks the dry lake and Fremont Valley.

See also
 
 List of lakes in California

References
 

Endorheic lakes of California
Salt flats of California
Lakes of the Mojave Desert
Lakes of Kern County, California
Mining in California
Landforms of Kern County, California
Lakes of California
Lakes of Southern California